Menethorpe is a hamlet and former civil parish, now in the parish of Burythorpe, in the Ryedale district, in the county of North Yorkshire, England. In 1931 the parish had a population of 68.

History 
The name "Menethorpe" means 'Men(n)ing's outlying farm/settlement'. Menethorpe was recorded in the Domesday Book as Mennistorp. Menethorpe was formerly a township in the parish of Westow and from 1866 was a civil parish in its own right. On 1 April 1935, the parish was abolished and merged with Burythorpe. Until 1974, it was part of the North Riding of Yorkshire when it became part of North Yorkshire.

The remains of the abandoned medieval village Menethorpe are visible as cropmarks and earthworks on aerial photographs.

References 

Hamlets in North Yorkshire
Former civil parishes in North Yorkshire
Ryedale